The 1959 Tulsa Golden Hurricane football team represented the University of Tulsa during the 1959 NCAA University Division football season. In their fifth year under head coach Bobby Dodds, the Golden Hurricane compiled a 5–5 record (2–2 against Missouri Valley Conference opponents), and finished in third place in the conference. The team's statistical leaders included Jerry Keeling with 752 passing yards, Bob Brumble with 599 rushing yards, and Buddy Kelly with 270 receiving yards.

Schedule

References

Tulsa
Tulsa Golden Hurricane football seasons
Tulsa Golden Hurricane football